Events in the year 1835 in Mexico.

Incumbents 

 Antonio López de Santa Anna – President of Mexico, until 27 January
 Miguel Barragán – President of Mexico, 28 January until 27 February 1836

Governors
 Aguascalientes: Pedro García Rojas
 Chiapas: Mariano Montes de Oca
 Chihuahua: 
 Coahuila: Juan José Elguézabal/José María Cantú/Marcial Borrego/Agustín Viesca y Montes/José Miguel Falcón/Bartolomé de Cárdenas/José Rafael Eça y Múzquiz
 Durango:  
 Guanajuato: 
 Guerrero: 
 Jalisco: José Antonio Romero
 State of Mexico:  
 Michoacán: 
 Nuevo León: Juan Nepomuceno de la Garza y Evía/Joaquín García
 Oaxaca: 
 Puebla: 
 Querétaro: José Rafael Canalizo 
 San Luis Potosí: 
 Sinaloa: 
 Sonora: 
 Tabasco: 
 Tamaulipas: Juan Nepomuceno de la Garza y Evía/José Guadalupe de Samano/José Antonio Fernández Izaguirre
 Veracruz: 
 Yucatán: 
 Zacatecas:

Events
 March 23 – The Mexican Academy of Language is established.
 May 23 – President Santa Anna separates by decree the State of Aguascalientes from the State of Zacatecas.
 October 2 – Texas Revolution – Battle of Gonzales: Mexican soldiers attempt to disarm the people of Gonzales, Texas but encounter stiff resistance from a hastily assembled militia.
 October 23 – The base for a Centralist Constitution is promulgated, giving birth to the Siete Leyes and establishing a Central Power overlooking the other three Powers of the Union.
 December 9 – The Army of the Republic of Texas captures San Antonio.

Notable births
november 8 – Concepción Lombardo, wife of Miguel Miramon, who served twice as President of Mexico between 1859 and 1860 (d. 1921)
 November 30 – Eligio Ancona del Castillo, lawyer, professor, journalist, historian, dramaturge, novelist and revolutionary politic, is born in Mérida, Yucatán.

Notable deaths
 September 9 – José Figueroa, Governor of Alta California (born 1792)

Dates unknown
 Pedro Patiño Ixtolinque, sculptor who worked on the Puebla Cathedral and the Mexico City Metropolitan Cathedral (born 1774)
 Vicente Francisco de Sarría, Franciscan missionary to Alta California (born 1767)
 José Félix Trespalacios, first Governor of Coahuila y Tejas and also a Senator from Chihuahua

Notes

 
Mexico
Years of the 19th century in Mexico